Gochnatia is a genus of flowering plants in the daisy family, Asteraceae. It is named for botanist Frédéric Karl Gochnat. The genus contains mainly shrubs and subshrubs, with a few trees and herbs. All of the species are native to the American tropics. Two species native to the mountains of Southeast Asia and formerly included here are now separated as the genus Leucomeris in subfamily Wunderlichioideae.

These plants produce flower heads containing whitish or yellow disc florets each with five deep lobes. The style has short, smooth branches, and the fruit is a lightly hairy cypsela with a pappus of bristles or scales.

 Species

References

Gochnatioideae
Asteraceae genera